Fusion Academy & Learning Center (often referred to as Fusion Academy or Fusion) is a private, alternative school for grades 6–12. All classes are taught on a one-to-one basis with one student and one teacher per classroom. Students generally complete schoolwork on-site, instead of at home.

History

Fusion Academy was founded in 1989 by Michelle Rose Gilman, as an after-school tutoring program in her garage in Solana Beach, California. The company began to offer a full-time curriculum in 2001. In 2009, the company opened its second campus in Los Angeles. In 2011, Inc. Magazine included Fusion Academy in its annual "Inc. 5000" list of America's fastest-growing private companies, the second time the company had made the list.

Campuses 
Fusion Academy campuses are located in the priciest zip codes throughout northern and southern California, Connecticut, Florida, Massachusetts, New Jersey, New York, Texas, Virginia, Illinois,North Carolina, Maryland, and Washington, D.C. The company targets high-income neighborhoods in major cities. As of December 2022 there are over 80 Fusion Academy campuses. On 22 January 2021, the teachers at the Brooklyn Fusion Academy campus officially joined New York City's United Federation of Teachers, making that school the second Fusion Academy to successfully unionize.
In 2022, Fusion Academy merged into  competitor Futures Academy. Any remaining Futures campuses who were around before the merge will rebrand their schools into Fusion branding.

Academics
Fusion Academy operates year-round and accommodates both full-time and part-time students, including those with ADHD and learning disabilities. Standard and honors-level courses include sciences, mathematics, history, social studies, the arts, English and foreign languages. Art and music enrichment programs cover topics such as studio art, performing arts, and music theory and recording. Customized summer programs are available in math, history, science, English and foreign languages. One hour breaks between classes (called "Homework Café") are intended to allow time to work on homework.

Campuses offer therapeutic support from outside professionals for which parents pay extra, compassion and tolerance education, staff mentoring, tutoring, organizational and homework assistance, and support in areas such as time management, preparation for high school entrance or SAT, ACT, GED exams, college applications and career planning. One session of college Consulting is offered per year. Parents are charged for additional  sessions in addition to the tuition.

References

External links
 

Alternative schools in California
Private high schools in California
Private middle schools in California
1989 establishments in California